Rhamnidium dictyophyllum is a species of plant in the family Rhamnaceae. It is endemic to Jamaica.

References

Flora of Jamaica
dictyophyllum
Endangered plants
Taxonomy articles created by Polbot